The Bleriot-SPAD S.33 was a small French airliner developed soon after World War I.  The aircraft was a biplane of conventional configuration whose design owed much to the Blériot company's contemporary fighter designs such as the S.20.  Four passengers could be accommodated in an enclosed cabin within the monocoque fuselage, and a fifth passenger could ride in the open cockpit beside the pilot. A great success, the S.33 dominated its field throughout the 1920s, initially on CMA's Paris-London route, and later on continental routes serviced by Franco-Roumaine.

One interesting development was a sole example converted by CIDNA to act as a blind-flying trainer. A set of controls was installed inside the passenger cabin, the windows of which had been blacked out.

Variants
S.33Single-engined passenger transport aircraft, powered by a  Salmson CM.9 radial piston engine. 41 aircraft built.
S.46Improved version of the S.33, powered by a  Lorraine-Dietrich 12Da engine. 38 built and sold to the Franco-Roumaine Company.
S.48A single S.33 temporarily re-engined in 1925, fitted with a  Lorraine 7M Mizar engine.
S.50Luxury version with passenger cabin enlarged to six seats, fitted with a  Hispano-Suiza 8Fb engine. Three were converted from S.33s, plus two all-new aircraft.

Operators
 
 Franco-Roumaine (20 aircraft)
 CMA (15 aircraft)
 
 SNETA (6 aircraft)

Specifications (S.33)

See also

References

Further reading
 
 

Blériot aircraft
Biplanes
Single-engined tractor aircraft
1920s French airliners
Aircraft first flown in 1920